Eugene S. Fraise (May 7, 1932 – November 27, 2020) was an American politician from Iowa.

Career
He served in the Iowa Senate from the 46th district from 1986, when he filled a vacancy left by Lowell Junkins' resignation, until 2013.

Fraise served on several committees in the Iowa Senate – the Appropriations committee; the Judiciary committee; and the Agriculture committee, of which he was the committee chairman.  He also served as vice chair of the Justice System Appropriations Subcommittee.  His prior political experience includes sitting on the Lee County Board of Supervisors for seven years.

Fraise was re-elected in 2004 with 14,272 votes (53%), defeating Republican opponent Doug P. Abolt.

Death
Fraise died from COVID-19 in West Burlington, Iowa, on November 27, 2020, at age 88.

References

External links
Senator Gene Fraise official Iowa Legislature site
Senator Gene Fraise official Iowa General Assembly site
State Senator Gene Fraise official constituency site
 

1932 births
2020 deaths
Deaths from the COVID-19 pandemic in Iowa
Democratic Party Iowa state senators
County supervisors in Iowa
People from Lee County, Iowa
People from Fort Madison, Iowa
Farmers from Iowa